Bongani is a given name. Notable people with the given name include:

 Bongani Jele (born 1986), South African cricket umpire
 Bongani Khumalo (born 1987), South African footballer
 Bongani Mahlangu (born 1979), South African boxer
 Bongani Masuku, South African vocalist
 Bongani Mayosi (1967–2018), South African cardiology professor
 Bongani Msomi, South African politician
 Bongani Mwelase (born 1982), South African boxer
 Bongani Ndodana-Breen (born 1975), South African composer
 Bongani Ndulula (born 1989), South African footballer
 Bongani Zungu (born 1992), South African footballer